Shahrdari Yasuj Football Club is an Iranian football club based in Yasuj, Iran. They currently compete in the Iran Football's 2nd Division.

History
Shahrdari Yasuj Football Club was founded in 2009, in their first year the team placed second in their grouping, gaining promotion to the Azadegan League.

In 2012, they historically beat Iran Pro League side Mes Kerman 4–1 in the Hazfi Cup to advance to the round of 16.

Season-by-season
The table below chronicles the achievements of the club in various competitions.

Players
As of July 1, 2013

First-team squad

References

Football clubs in Iran
Association football clubs established in 2009